Pashokov may refer to:

 Pashkov House
 Alexander Pashkov (born 1944), Soviet Hockey League player
 Georgy Pashkov (1886–1925), Russian artist
 Vladimir Pashkov (born 1961), Russian politician